Hetero derives from the Greek word heteros meaning "different" or "other". It may refer to: 

Heterodoxy, belief or practice that differs from what is assumed as orthodoxy
Heterosexuality, attraction towards the opposite sex
Hetero Drugs, an Indian pharmaceutical company

See also